SDYuShOR Sokil-89 Kyiv was an ice hockey team in Kyiv, Ukraine. They participated in the Ukrainian Hockey Championship during the 2005-06 season. The team was made up solely of players born in 1989 or later.

They finished with a record of 3 wins and 17 losses, with 25 goals for and 125 goals against during the 2005-06 season.

References

Ice hockey teams in Ukraine
Sokil Kyiv
Sport in Kyiv